Henry Frazier Reams Jr., generally known as Frazier Reams Jr. (October 21, 1929 – July 20, 2020), was an American politician and attorney in Ohio. He was the son of U.S. Representative Frazier Reams Sr. Reams served in the Ohio State Senate from 1963 to 1966. In 1966, Reams was nominated by the Democratic party for the office of Governor of Ohio. He lost to the incumbent, Jim Rhodes.

See also
Election Results, Ohio Governor
Election Results, Ohio Governor (Democratic Primaries)

References

Democratic Party Ohio state senators
Politicians from Toledo, Ohio
Lawyers from Toledo, Ohio
Washington and Lee University alumni
1929 births
2020 deaths